HMAS Alfie Cam was an auxiliary minesweeper operated by the Royal Australian Navy during World War II. She was launched in 1919 in Cardiff, Wales, as Asama. The ship was purchased by T. A. Field and operated in Australian waters from 1928. She was requisitioned by the Royal Australian Navy in 1940. She was returned to her owners after the war and was later scrapped in 1953.

Operational history

Asama was purchased by Mr. T. A. Field and sailed to Sydney, Australia in 1928.  She was purchased by Cam & Sons Pty Ltd in February 1929 and was renamed Alfie Cam.

In 1940, Alfie Cam was requisitioned by the Royal Australian Navy for use as an auxiliary. She was returned to her owners in 1946 and resuming trawling. She became grounded on a reef, near Twofold Bay, New South Wales on 12 July 1953 and damaged her hull.

Fate
Too expensive to repair, she was sold in 1953 and was scrapped.

Citations

References
Naval Historical Society of Australia - "On this day" (July-September 1940)

1919 ships
Minesweepers of the Royal Australian Navy
Ships built in Wales
Fishing ships of Australia